Catherine Galliford (born 1966-1967) was a Royal Canadian Mounted Police Corporal in British Columbia, Canada known for making sexual harassment allegations against the RCMP, and being a high-profile police spokesperson for the Missing Women's Task Force.

Galliford served as a spokesperson for the Missing Women's Task Force (associated with the BC Missing Women Investigation), who came to prominence in 2011 for bringing forward allegations of extensive sexual harassment and misconduct within the RCMP.
Chief among her allegations is the claim that officers in the Missing Women's Task Force neglected their duties and tolerated a three-year delay in apprehending serial killer Robert Pickton. When asked to testify before the Missing Women Commission of Inquiry, Galliford stated that she would not be testifying for the RCMP "but rather, on behalf of the victims."
The individuals she named included Rob Nicholson, the Attorney General of Canada, Ian MacDonald, a doctor for the RCMP, and four officers. One month before hearings began in 2012, the inquiry deemed Galliford "too fragile" to testify, citing alcoholism and post traumatic stress disorder.

After Galliford came forward, the RCMP denied her accusations and sought to dismiss her from the force. In 2013, a 2015 trial date was set for her case, but this was later delayed again to 2017. A class action lawsuit proceeded alongside hers and Janet Merlo has credited Galliford with inspiring four hundred female police officers to join it. In May 2016, Galliford dropped her complaint against Dr. Ian MacDonald and accepted a settlement from the other defendants. She was subsequently given a medical discharge from the RCMP.

Galliford has a son with her former husband Darren Campbell, a sergeant major for the RCMP. This information was released when their son, Connor Campbell, was arrested in September 2015 along with two others for the murder of 19-year old Langley resident Nicholas Hannon. Connor Campbell was convicted in November 2016 and has called Galliford every day since the life sentence began. Galliford stated that the effects of PTSD and agoraphobia prevented her from attending the sentencing. She later said "I carry some guilt because after watching what I went through, I know that he developed a mistrust of the RCMP. But I think parents are parents, and I was a good parent. I know that."

References

1960s births
Living people
Canadian women police officers
Royal Canadian Mounted Police officers
Sexual harassment in Canada